The Chennai Super Kings (CSK) are an Indian franchise cricket team based in Chennai, Tamil Nadu which plays in the Indian Premier League (IPL). Founded in 2008 this team led by Dhoni. The team plays its home matches at the M. A. Chidambaram Stadium in Chennai.

After serving a two-year suspension from the IPL starting July 2015  2013 IPL betting case (along with Rajasthan Royals), the Super Kings returned to the league in 2018, winning the championship in the comeback season. The team is captained by Mahendra Singh Dhoni and coached by Stephen Fleming.

The brand value of the Super Kings in 2018 was estimated at $95 million, making them one of the most valuable franchises in the IPL.  in January 2022 CSK  became the first sports Unicorn in India

Listing criteria 
In general the top five are listed in each category (except when there is a tie for the last place among the five, when all the tied record holders are noted).

Listing notation 
Team notation
 (180–3) indicates that a team scored 180 runs for three wickets and the innings was closed, either due to a successful run chase or if no playing time remained
 (200) indicates that a team scored 200 runs and was all out

Team Performance

Team wins, losses and draws

Result records

Greatest win margin (by runs)

Greatest win margin (by balls remaining)

Greatest win margins (by wickets)

Narrowest win margin (by runs)

Narrowest win margin (by balls remaining)

Narrowest win margins (by wickets)

Tied Matches

Greatest loss margin (by runs)

Greatest loss margin (by balls remaining)

Greatest loss margins (by wickets)

Narrowest loss margin (by runs)

Narrowest loss margin (by balls remaining)

Narrowest loss margins (by wickets)

Team scoring records

Highest Totals

Lowest Totals

Highest Totals Conceded

Lowest Totals Conceded

Highest match aggregate

Lowest match aggregate

Individual Records (Batting)

Most runs

Highest individual score

Highest career average

Highest strike rates

Most half-centuries

Most centuries

Most Sixes

Most Fours

Highest strike rates in an inning

Most sixes in an inning

Most fours in an inning

Most runs in a series

Most ducks

Individual Records (Bowling)

Most career wickets

Best figures in an innings

Best career average

Best career economy rate

Best career strike rate

Most four-wickets (& over) hauls in an innings

Best economy rates in an inning

Best strike rates in an inning

Most runs conceded in a match

Most wickets in a series

Hat-trick

Individual Records (Wicket-keeping)

Most career dismissals

Most career catches

Most career stumpings

Most dismissals in an innings

Most dismissals in a series

Individual Records (Fielding)

Most career catches

Most catches in an innings

Most catches in a series

Individual Records (Other)

Most matches

Most matches as captain

Partnership Record

Highest partnerships by wicket

Highest partnerships by runs

External  Links
IPL team Chennai Super Kings web page on official IPL T20 website - IPLT20.com
Official Site

References 

Stats
Lists of Indian cricket records and statistics
Stats
Indian Premier League lists